Fred Finneyy (10 March 1924 – January 2005) was an English footballer who played as a defender player. He played for Liverpool FC in 1947.

References

External links
 LFC History profile

1924 births
English footballers
Liverpool F.C. players
2005 deaths
Association football defenders